Cataclysta pleonaxalis is a Crambidae species in the genus Cataclysta. It was described by George Hampson in 1897 and is known from New Guinea and Fergusson Island.

References

Moths described in 1897
Acentropinae